The city of Las Vegas, Nevada and its surrounding unincorporated communities in the Las Vegas Valley are the sites of more than 160 high-rises, 42 of which stand taller than . The tallest structure in the city is the Strat tower, which rises  just north of the Las Vegas Strip. The tower is also the tallest observation tower in the United States. However, the Strat is not considered a building because the vast majority of the tower is not habitable. The tallest building in Las Vegas is the Fontainebleau Las Vegas, which rises  and was topped out in November 2008. This building, however, remained unfinished for several years due to the late-2000s recession. The tallest completed building in the city is the 59-story Resorts World, which rises  and was completed in 2021.

Beginning in the 1960s, high-rise hotels began to become more concentrated on the Las Vegas Strip. Las Vegas entered into a skyscraper-building boom in the late 1990s that has continued to the present; of the city's 40 tallest skyscrapers, 39 were completed after 1997. As of 2012, the skyline of Las Vegas is ranked 66th in the world and 18th in the United States with 176 completed high-rises.

The tallest building approved for the city is the World Jewelry Center, which is planned for construction in Downtown Las Vegas. The  tower is part of a proposal to construct a hub for the world's jewelry industry, across from World Market Center Las Vegas. The tallest building under construction in Las Vegas is the Fontainebleau Las Vegas, which has also been the tallest building in the city since its topping out in November 2008; construction on the building was suspended in mid-2009. Following numerous delays, the project is now scheduled to open in late 2023 as the original name, Fontainebleau.


Tallest buildings
This list ranks completed and topped out skyscrapers in Las Vegas that stand at least 400 feet (122 m) tall, based on standard height measurement. This includes spires and architectural details, but does not include antenna masts. An equal sign (=) following a rank indicates the same height between two or more buildings. The "Year" column indicates the year in which a building was completed. Freestanding observation towers, while not habitable buildings, are included for comparison purposes, but not ranked.

Many Las Vegas skyscrapers are located on the Las Vegas Strip, the majority of which is located outside the Las Vegas city limits. This list includes all skyscrapers which are included within the city limits of Las Vegas and the surrounding communities which use Las Vegas as an official address. The United States Postal Service uses "Las Vegas, NV" as the official mailing address for the unincorporated places of Paradise, Winchester, and Spring Valley, and as such the distinction between the city and the surrounding communities is often not apparent.

Tallest under construction or proposed

Under construction
There is currently one building under construction in the Las Vegas Valley that is planned to rise at least 100 meters (328 ft).

Approved or proposed
This lists buildings that are approved or proposed in the Las Vegas Valley and are planned to rise at least 100 meters (328 ft).

Timeline of tallest buildings
This lists buildings that once held the title of tallest building in Las Vegas as well as the current titleholder, Fontainebleau Las Vegas. The Strat observation tower has been the tallest free-standing structure in the city since its 1996 completion, but since it is not a fully habitable building it is not included in this list.

Explanatory notes 
A. ^ According to the Council on Tall Buildings and Urban Habitat, freestanding observation towers are not considered to be buildings, as they are not fully habitable structures. These structures are included for comparative purposes.

References

Citations

General and cited sources

External links
 Diagram of Las Vegas skyscrapers on SkyscraperPage

Tallest buildings
Las Vegas
Tallest buildings in Las Vegas